Leonardo Santana da Silva (born 27 March 1988), commonly known as Leo Santana, is a Brazilian futsal player who plays as a defender for Barcelona and the Brazilian national futsal team.

References

External links
Liga Nacional Fútbol Sala profile
FC Barcelona profile

1988 births
Living people
People from Juiz de Fora
Brazilian expatriate sportspeople in Kazakhstan
Brazilian expatriate sportspeople in Russia
Brazilian expatriate sportspeople in Spain
Brazilian men's futsal players